R572 road may refer to:
 R572 road (Ireland)
 R572 road (South Africa)